The slaughter of Corumbiara was the result of violent conflict occurred on August 9, 1995 in the municipality of Corumbiara in the state of Rondônia, Brazil. The conflict began when police forces attacked the landless who were occupying an area, resulting in the death of 10 people, including a nine-year-old child and two policemen.

In August 1995, about 600 farmers were mobilized to take the Santa Elina farm, building a camp in unproductive large estates. On the morning of 9, around three o'clock, armed gunmen, recruited from the farms of the region, besides Military Police soldiers with their faces covered, launched attacks on the camp.

References 

1995 in Brazil
Massacres in Brazil